Purdon may refer to:

Purdon, Texas, an unincorporated community in Navarro County, Texas in the United States.

Purdon may also refer to the following people:
Charles Purdon (1838–1926), South African fruit farmer
Corran Purdon (1921–2018), Irish-born British soldier
Frank Purdon, Ireland rugby union international
Jock Purdon (1925–1998), Scottish poet and songwriter
Katherine Purdon (1852-1920), Irish writer
Ted Purdon (1930–2007), South African professional footballer
Tim Purdon, former United States Attorney for the District of North Dakota
Major-General William Purdon (1881–1950), Irish soldier, medical administrator and international rugby player

English-language surnames